Yanıkhan is an archaeological site in Mersin Province, Turkey.

History
The original name of the site is not known. But according to archaeological evidence  it is a 5th and 6th century Byzantine site. First reference to its existence was by Professor Michael Gough in 1959.

Archaeology 
Yanıkhan was a village. There are more than 30 house ruins. The most important building is a basilica. Although the houses are completely demolished a part of the basilica survives. In addition to main abscissa there are two minor abscissas. There are two  sarcophagi. One may be an arcosolium which may belong to a certain Georgios Konon Chrisyophoros who, according to an inscription, was the commissioner of the basilica. There is also a cistern to the west of the basilica.  to the east of the basilica there is another church (called Church B by the archaeologists).

References

Erdemli District
Populated places of the Byzantine Empire
Archaeological sites in Mersin Province, Turkey